Kuranganilmuttam Valeeswarar Temple
 is a Hindu temple located at Kuranganilmuttam in Tiruvannamalai district, Tamil Nadu, India. The presiding deity is Shiva. He is called as Valeeswarar. His consort is known as Irayarvalai Ammai.

Significance 
It is one of the shrines of the 275 Paadal Petra Sthalams – Shiva Sthalams glorified in the early medieval Tevaram poems by Tamil Saivite Nayanar Sambandar.

References 

Shiva temples in Tiruvannamalai district
Padal Petra Stalam